Matt Katz (born July 4, 1978) is an American journalist.

Career and works
Katz works for WNYC and New Jersey Public Radio, and has written for Politico, The New York Times, The Washington Post and The New Republic. He was previously a reporter at The Philadelphia Inquirer, the Courier-Post and the Daily Record.  He is known for his coverage of New Jersey Governor Chris Christie.  He ran The Christie Tracker for New Jersey Public Radio.

Katz was a member of a WNYC team that won a 2015 Peabody Award for its series on Governor Christie entitled, "Chris Christie, White House Ambitions and the Abuse of Power."  He won the Livingston Award for International Reporting for a series on reconstruction efforts in Afghanistan.

Katz is the author of American Governor: Chris Christie's Bridge to Redemption, a political profile of Chris Christie published on January 19, 2016 by Simon & Schuster.

Prior to becoming a political journalist, Katz was known as South Jersey's Carrie Bradshaw when he wrote a dating advice column.

He is Jewish and asserts that he suffered anti-semitic harassment as a result of reporting critically on U.S. presidential candidate Donald Trump.

Background and education
Katz is the son of Roberta and Richard Katz of Roslyn, New York. He married Deborah Anne Hurwitz in 2004.

Katz has an undergraduate degree in Political Communication from George Washington University.  He is member of the Kappa Sigma fraternity.

References

1978 births
Living people
People from Roslyn, New York
Jewish American journalists
George Washington University School of Media and Public Affairs alumni
Journalists from New Jersey
Livingston Award winners for International Reporting